BusConnects is a transport infrastructure programme, managed by the National Transport Authority (NTA), focused on the bus networks in several cities in Ireland. Described by the NTA as intended to "improve bus services across the country", as of mid-2022 the program was in "implementation" phase in Dublin, "consultation" phase in Cork, with the Minister for Transport projecting similar initiatives in Galway, Limerick and Waterford. Aspects of the plans proved controversial with local politicians, residents and unions in both Dublin and Cork.

Background
A 2017 report, commissioned by the NTA and produced by US-based consulting firm Jarrett Walker + Associates (previously involved in similar projects in New Zealand), set out a number of options for the redesign of Dublin's bus transport network. The proposed purpose of the redesign was to improve network functionality and increase bus ridership in the Dublin area. The report noted that the existing network focused on radial routes (from the suburbs into the city centre) and had very few orbital or crossing routes (from suburb to suburb). Arising from this report, an initial network proposal was released for public consultation in mid-2018. 

According to a press release issued by the Department of Transport in March 2022, it was noted that that, while a "final budget and delivery schedule for BusConnects Dublin" had not been established, the proposed budget was then projected to be €4 billion and work speculated to "be substantially complete by 2030".

Initiatives

Dublin

The BusConnects program in Dublin was split into phases, for which the main consultation initiatives concluded in 2020. The NTA began implementing the new network in stages, starting in 2021. These included:
 Phase 1 (H-Spine) - initially rolled out in June 2021, when routes 29a, 31/a/b and 32 were replaced by routes H1, H2 and H3.
 Phase 2 (C-Spine) - launched in November 2021 in West Dublin and East Kildare, this involved the introduction of several routes operated by Dublin Bus and Go-Ahead Ireland, including the C-Spine (C1, C2, C3, C4), route 52, a number of peak-only and local routes and two night-time routes.
 Phase 3 (N-Orbital) - launched in May 2022 with the N4 and N6 north Dublin orbitals.
 Phase 4 (G-Spine) - launched in October 2022 with routes G1, G2 and 60.

During both the implementation and consultation phases, the BusConnects projects in Dublin attracted significant controversy and criticism, including from service users, residents, politicians, and transport unions. Concerns included route coverage, total journey times, allowing for route access and changes, actual performance and "no shows", property "taking" required to implement routes, and reduction in road space for existing commuter traffic. Regarding the suburb of Finglas, independent Dublin City Councillor Noeleen Reilly has noted that overall, BusConnects has had an adverse effect on the area rather than providing residents with greater service. Similar sentiments have been expressed in Ballyfermot.

Cork

The consultation phase for the proposed BusConnects project in Cork was opened in 2022. The published proposals attracted significant controversy and complaint from home-owners, politicians, transport unions, and other stakeholders. According to reports from mid-2022, concerns were raised in particular about the proposed demolition of old stone walls, the potential for nearly 1000 properties to lose parts of their gardens through compulsory purchase orders, the loss of sections of Ballybrack Woods in Douglas, and the felling of 1,400 mature trees along proposed routes.

Limerick
In February 2023, the National Transport Authority published a draft version of a new bus network for Limerick city. The network redesign is intended to be rolled out in 2025.

Other cities

As of March 2022, the then Minister of Transport proposed "acceleration" and a rollout of BusConnects initiatives to Galway, Limerick and Waterford.

See also
 Public transport in Ireland
 Quality Bus Corridor

References

External links
 
 

Bus transport in the Republic of Ireland